Cecil Brooke-Short (18 December 1894 – 28 June 1937) was an English first-class cricketer and Royal Navy officer.

Born in Trinidad, Brooke-Short was commissioned into the Royal Marines as a second lieutenant in October 1913. He served in the marines in the First World War, during which he was granted the temporary rank of lieutenant in October 1914, with confirmation in the full rank coming in October 1916. He was then promoted to the rank of captain in October 1917. After the war, Brooke-Short was placed on half-pay in September 1919, while holding a special appointment, before returning to the establishment in December 1921. He made a single appearance in first-class cricket for the Royal Navy against the British Army cricket team at Lord's in 1925. Batting twice in the match, he was dismissed for a single run in the Royal Navy first-innings by Adrian Gore, while in their second-innings he was unbeaten on 3 runs. He was later promoted to the rank of major in November 1931, before passing away in June 1937 at the Liugong Island Royal Navy base in China.

References

External links

1894 births
1937 deaths
Royal Marines officers
Royal Marines personnel of World War I
English cricketers
Royal Navy cricketers